John Dent (21 August 1761 – 14 November 1826) was an English banker and politician.

Life
He was the eldest son of Robert Dent, a banker of London and Clapham.

He was a partner in Child's Bank, and Tory Member of Parliament for Lancaster from 1790 to 1812. He was a defeated candidate at Poole in 1812 but was returned to Parliament there in 1818, and again, unopposed, in 1822.

Dent earned the nickname "Dog Dent" by his interest in the Dog Tax Bill of 1796. He was known also as a book collector and a member of the Roxburghe Club.

He was elected a Fellow of the Royal Society in 1811 and a Fellow of the Society of Antiquaries of London.

He died in 1826 at his Mayfair home in London.

Family
Dent married Anne Jane Williamson of Roby Hall, Liverpool in 1800; they had 5 sons and 5 daughters.

References

1760s births
1826 deaths
English bankers
Members of the Parliament of Great Britain for English constituencies
British MPs 1790–1796
British MPs 1796–1800
Members of the Parliament of the United Kingdom for English constituencies
UK MPs 1801–1802
UK MPs 1802–1806
UK MPs 1807–1812
UK MPs 1818–1820
UK MPs 1820–1826
Fellows of the Royal Society
Fellows of the Society of Antiquaries of London
English book and manuscript collectors